One third of Cherwell District Council in Oxfordshire, England is elected each year, followed by one year without election. Since the last boundary changes in 2002, 50 councillors have been elected from 28 wards.

Political control
Since the foundation of the council in 1973 political control of the council has been held by the following parties:

Leadership
The leaders of the council since 2001 have been:

Council elections
1973 Cherwell District Council election
1976 Cherwell District Council election
1979 Cherwell District Council election (New ward boundaries)
1980 Cherwell District Council election
1982 Cherwell District Council election
1983 Cherwell District Council election
1984 Cherwell District Council election
1986 Cherwell District Council election (District boundary changes took place but the number of seats remained the same)
1987 Cherwell District Council election
1988 Cherwell District Council election (District boundary changes took place but the number of seats remained the same)
1990 Cherwell District Council election
1991 Cherwell District Council election (District boundary changes took place but the number of seats remained the same)
1992 Cherwell District Council election
1994 Cherwell District Council election
1995 Cherwell District Council election
1996 Cherwell District Council election
1998 Cherwell District Council election
1999 Cherwell District Council election
2000 Cherwell District Council election
2002 Cherwell District Council election (New ward boundaries reduced the number of seats by two)
2003 Cherwell District Council election
2004 Cherwell District Council election
2006 Cherwell District Council election
2007 Cherwell District Council election
2008 Cherwell District Council election
2010 Cherwell District Council election
2011 Cherwell District Council election
2012 Cherwell District Council election
2014 Cherwell District Council election
2015 Cherwell District Council election
2016 Cherwell District Council election (New ward boundaries)
2018 Cherwell District Council election
2019 Cherwell District Council election
2021 Cherwell District Council election
2022 Cherwell District Council election

By-election results

1994-1998

1998-2002

2002-2006

2006-2010

2010-2014

2014-2016

2016-2022

References

 By-election results

External links
Cherwell District Council

 
Cherwell District
Council elections in Oxfordshire
District council elections in England